Indiana Dunes National Park is a National Park Service unit on the shore of Lake Michigan in Indiana, United States. A BioBlitz took place there on May 15 and 16, 2009. During that time, a list of organisms was compiled which included a preliminary list of the reptiles of the area.

Turtles (Testudinate)
 Chelydra serpentina serpentina - common snapping turtle
 Chrysemys picta marginata - painted turtle
 Emydoidea blandingi - Blanding's turtle
 Pseudemys scripta elegans - cooter
 Sternotherus odoratus - common musk turtle

Lizards (Sauris)
 Cnemidophorus sexlineatus viridis - prairie racerunner
 Plestiodon fasciatus - five-lined skink 
 Ophisaurus attenuatus attenuatus - slender glass lizard

Snakes (Serpentes)
 Coluber constrictor flaviventris - eastern racer
 Heterodon platyrhinos - eastern hognose snake
 Lampropeltis triangulum - milk snake
 Nerodia sipedon sipedon - common watersnake
 Storeria dekayi wrightorum - midland brown snake
 Thamnophis proximus - western ribbon snake
 Thamnophis sirtalis - common garter snake
 Thamnophis sirtalis sirtalis - eastern garter snake
 Thamnophis radix radix - eastern plains garter snake

Notes

Reptiles of the Indiana Dunes
Indiana Dunes